Alexandru Bădiţă (born 2 October 1937) is a Romanian former water polo player. He competed at the 1956 Summer Olympics and the 1960 Summer Olympics.

References

External links
 

1937 births
Living people
Romanian male water polo players
Olympic water polo players of Romania
Water polo players at the 1956 Summer Olympics
Water polo players at the 1960 Summer Olympics
Water polo players from Bucharest